Henry Williams (1895 – death unknown), nicknamed "Flick", was an American Negro league catcher between 1923 and 1937.

Williams made his Negro leagues debut in 1923 with the Kansas City Monarchs. He spent the majority of his career with the St. Louis Stars, and contributed three hits and two RBIs in the Stars' 1928 Negro National League championship series victory over the Chicago American Giants.

References

External links
 and Seamheads

1895 births
Date of birth missing
Year of death missing
Place of birth missing
Place of death missing
Indianapolis ABCs players
Kansas City Monarchs players
Pittsburgh Crawfords players
St. Louis Stars (baseball) players
St. Louis Stars (1937) players
Baseball catchers
Baseball players from Texas